Sterling Alpa Stryker (born July 29, 1895 in Atlantic Highlands, New Jersey, died November 5, 1964 in Red Bank, New Jersey). He was a pitcher in Major League Baseball who pitched in twenty games for the 1924 Boston Braves and in two games with the 1926 Brooklyn Robins.

External links

1895 births
1964 deaths
Baseball players from New Jersey
Major League Baseball pitchers
Brooklyn Robins players
Boston Braves players
Montreal Royals players
Newark Bears (IL) players
San Antonio Bears players
Toledo Mud Hens players
Indianapolis Indians players
New Haven Indians players
Worcester Panthers players
Springfield Ponies players
Seattle Indians players
Buffalo Bisons (minor league) players
Reading Keystones players
People from Atlantic Highlands, New Jersey
Sportspeople from Monmouth County, New Jersey